BNP Paribas Fortis is an international bank based in Belgium and is a subsidiary of BNP Paribas. It was formerly, together with Fortis Bank Nederland, the banking arm of the financial institution Fortis. After the ultimately unsuccessful ABN-AMRO takeover, the subprime crisis and management mistakes led to the sale of the Dutch and Luxembourg parts of the banking branch to the Dutch and Luxembourg governments. Fortis Bank itself was first partly bought by the Belgian government (for €4.7 billion), then fully purchased by the government and sold to BNP Paribas.

BNP Paribas Fortis is the largest bank in Belgium. It offers a full range of financial services to private and corporate clients, wealthy individuals, companies, public and financial institutions. The activities are divided into four business lines: Retail & Private Banking, Corporate & Public Banking, Corporate & Investment Banking and Investment Solutions. The bank supports its clients abroad via offices in some 80 countries of the parent bank BNP Paribas.

Herman Daems is Chairman of the Board of Directors of BNP Paribas Fortis. The CEO is Maxime Jadot.

Subsidiaries 
 Forti

See also

List of investors in Bernard L. Madoff Securities

References

External links 

 Website for individuals & small enterprises
 International & corporate site
 Corporate & Public Bank, Belgium
The major role of the Générale de Banque in the development in Belgium industry, in Source d'Histoire
The street Royale in the heart of economic history of Belgium, in Source d'Histoire

Banks of Belgium
BNP Paribas
Banks established in 1990